Jaane Pehchaane with Javed Akhtar is an Indian television Hindi-language entertainment show based on the Indian film industry that aired on the EPIC Channel. The show is hosted by the popular Bollywood lyricist, Javed Akhtar. In the show, Javed Akhtar explores the evolution of Bollywood characters. The show premiered on 8 July 2015 and aired twenty-six episodes of half-hour each.

Each episode takes on one role while the series covers roles like villains, heroes, brothers, etc. In each episode, Javed Akhtar reminisces about popular characters, films, scenes and dialogues ands shows how these roles have evolved in time.

Production
The show is produced by Cinestaan Digital Pvt. Ltd and directed and co-written by Tarika Khattar.

Episodes

References

External links
 

Indian television series
2015 Indian television series debuts
Epic TV original programming
Indian television talk shows
Hindi cinema
Television series about filmmaking